The Pribilof Island shrew (Sorex pribilofensis) is a species of mammal in the family Soricidae. It is found only on Alaska's Pribilof Islands.

References

External links
 http://aknhp.uaa.alaska.edu/zoology/pdfs/mammals/Priblof%20Shrew.pdf

Sorex
Mammals of the United States
Taxonomy articles created by Polbot
Mammals described in 1895
Endemic fauna of Alaska